

The Dietrich DP.II Bussard was a 1920s German two-seat training biplane designed by Richard Dietrich and built by the Dietrich-Gobiet Flugzeugwerke as Kassel.

Development
The DP.II was a development of the earlier DP.I with the change to be a cantilever unequal-span biplane. The DP.II was built with wooden wings and a steel-frame fabric covered fuselage and tailplane. The aircraft had a fixed tailskid landing gear and was powered by a Siemens-Halske radial engine. Following the single Siemens-Halske Sh 4 powered prototype was a production run of 58 improved DP.IIa variants powered by Siemens-Halske Sh 5 radial engines.

Variants

DP.II
Prototype with a Siemens-Halske Sh 4 radial engine, one built.
DP.IIa
Production variant with a Siemens-Halske Sh 5 radial engine, 53 built.

Specifications (DP.IIa)

References

Notes

Bibliography

1920s German civil utility aircraft
Aerobatic aircraft
Biplanes